Melinho (born 26 March 1980) is a Brazilian former professional footballer who played as a midfielder.

Career
Melinho previously played for Guarani in the Copa do Brasil. He also played for Akratitos in the Greek Super League. On 9 July 2009, he moved from SK Sigma Olomouc on loan to TuS Koblenz.

References

External links
 
 

1980 births
Living people
Brazilian footballers
Brazilian expatriate footballers
União Agrícola Barbarense Futebol Clube players
Guarani FC players
Associação Portuguesa de Desportos players
A.P.O. Akratitos Ano Liosia players
Czech First League players
SFC Opava players
SK Sigma Olomouc players
Villarreal CF players
TuS Koblenz players
2. Bundesliga players
FC DAC 1904 Dunajská Streda players
Slovak Super Liga players
Association football midfielders
Expatriate footballers in Slovakia
Brazilian expatriate sportspeople in Slovakia
Expatriate footballers in the Czech Republic
Brazilian expatriate sportspeople in the Czech Republic
Expatriate footballers in Germany
Brazilian expatriate sportspeople in Germany
Expatriate footballers in Greece
Brazilian expatriate sportspeople in Greece